Venus Williams was the defending champion, but lost in third round to Jelena Dokic.

Monica Seles won the title by defeating Amélie Mauresmo 6–2, 7–6(7–4) in the final. It was the 3rd title of the year for Seles and the 47th of her career.

Seeds
The first eight seeds received a bye into the second round.

Draw

Finals

Top half

Section 1

Section 2

Bottom half

Section 3

Section 4

References
 Main and Qualifying draws

Italian Open - Singles
Women's Singles